AVS Video Editor is a video editing software published by Online Media Technologies Ltd. It is a part of AVS4YOU software suite which includes video, audio, image editing and conversion, disc editing and burning, document conversion and registry cleaner programs. It offers the opportunity to create and edit videos with a vast variety of video and audio effects, text and transitions; capture video from screen, web or DV cameras and VHS tape; record voice; create menus for discs, as well as to save them to plenty of video file formats, burn to discs or publish on Facebook, YouTube, Flickr, etc.

Description

Interface 
The layout consists of the timeline or storyboard view, preview pane and media library (transitions, video effects, text or disc menus) collections. The storyboard view shows the sequence of video clips with the transitions between them and used to change the order of clips or add transitions. Timeline view consists of main video, audio, effects, video overlay and text lines for editing.
 Once on the timeline video can be duplicated, split, muted, frozen, cropped, stabilized, its speed can be slowed down or increased, audio and color corrected

Importing footage 
Video, audio and image files necessary for video project can be imported into the program from computer hard disk drive. User can also capture video from computer screen, web or mini DV camera, as well as from VHS tape, record voice.

Output (web, device, disc, format)
AVS Video Editor gives the opportunity to save video to a computer hard drive to one of the video formats: AVI, DVD, Blu-ray, MOV, MP4, M4V, MPEG, WMV, MKV, WebM, M2TS, TS, FLV, SWF, RM, 3GP, GIF, DPG, AMV, MTV; burn to DVD or Blu-ray disc with menus; create a video for mobile players, mobile phones or gaming consoles and upload it right to the device. The most popular devices such as Apple iPod, Apple iPhone, Apple iPad, Sony PSP, Samsung Galaxy, Android and BlackBerry smartphones and tablets are supported. There is also an option to create a video that can be streamed via web and save it into Flash or WebM format or for the popular web services: YouTube, Facebook, Telly (Twitvid), Dailymotion, Flickr and Dropbox.

Features 
Single and multithread modes: if a computer supports multi-threading, video creation process is performed faster in multithread mode, especially on a multi-core system.
Customization of the output file settings, such as bitrate, frame rate, frame size, video and audio codecs, etc.
Transitions - help video clips smoothly go into one another, dissolve or overlap two video or image files.
Fade in and fade out video and audio files - dissolve a video to and from a blank image, reduce the audio volume at the end of the video and increase at the beginning.
Slideshow creation - create a presentation of a series of still images.
Voice recording 
Projects - once a project is created and saved, the next time saving video to some other format will be fast, projects are also used if a user do not have a possibility to create, edit and save video all at once. 
Video overlay option - superpose video image over the video clip that is being edited.
Disk menu and chapters creation - an option for DVD and Blu-ray video.
Freeze frame - make a still shot from a video clip.
Stabilization feature - reduce jittering or blurring caused by shaky motions of a camera.
Enhanced deinterlacing method - increase video quality for interlaced input file - spots and blurred areas are compensated.
Scene detection - search and separate one scene of the video from the other.
Loop DVD and SWF - output SWF and DVD video are played back continuously.
Caching for processing high definition files - create a duplicate video file smaller in size to use it on the preview window and accelerate processing of HD files.
Chroma key option - add video overlay half transparent so that only part of it is visible and all the rest disappears to reveal the video underneath.
Capture video material from DV tapes, VHS tapes, web cameras, etc.
Movie closing credits - add information on movie editing, e.g. crew, cast, data, etc. 
Creeping line, subtitles, text - add different captions (static and animated), shapes and images to video. 
Speech balloons and other graphic objects - geometrical shapes to highlight an object in the video.  
Zoom effect - magnify or reduce the view of the image.
Rotate effect - rotate video image at different degrees, e.g. 90, 180, etc. 
Grayscale and old movie effects - create a black and white video image. Old movie adds also scratches, noise, shake and dust to video, as if it's being played on an old projector. 
Blur and sharpen effects -  visually smooth and soften an image, or make video image better focused. 
Snow and particles effects -  adds snow or various objects (bubbles, flowers, leaves, butterflies etc.) that are moving, flying or falling on the video. 
Pan and zoom 
Timer, countdown effects - add a timepiece that  measures or counts down a time interval to the video being edited.
Snapshots - capture a particular moment of a video clip.
Sound track replacement - mute audio track from video and add another one.
Audio amplify, noise removal, equalizer, etc. - make video sound louder, attenuate the noise, change frequency pattern of the audio, make some other audio adjustments.
Trim and multi-trim options - change video clip duration cutting out unnecessary parts or detect scenes and cut out parts in any place of the video clip.
Color correction (brightness, temperature, contrast, saturation, gamma, etc.) effects - allow adjustment of tonal range, color, and sharpness of video files.
Crop scale effect - get rid of mattes that appear after changing aspect ratio of a video file.
Adjusting the Playback Speed 
Volume and balance - change sound volume in the output video. Change volume value proportion for main video and added soundtrack, completely mute main video audio and leave added soundtrack only, etc.

Utilities embedded into AVS Video Editor 
AVS Mobile Uploader is used to transfer edited and converted media files to portable devices via Bluetooth, Infrared or USB connection.
AVS Video Burner is used to burn converted video files to different disc types: CD, DVD, Blu-ray.
AVS Video Recorder is used to capture video from analog video sources and supports different types of devices: capture card, web camera (webcam), DV camera, HDV camera.
AVS Video Uploader is used to transfer video files to popular video-sharing websites, like Facebook, Dailymotion, YouTube, Photobucket, TwitVid, MySpace, Flickr.
AVS Screen Capture is used to capture any actions on the desktop to make presentations or video tutorials more vivid and easily comprehensible.

Important upgrades 

The initial release of AVS Video Editor was in 2003 when the program was offered inside AVS software bundles together with AVS Video Tools, AVS Audio Tools and DVD Copy software. In 2005 the program is offered as a part of multifunctional AVS4YOU software suite. AVS Video Editor is frequently updated. The main updates include adding several important features for video editing

See also 
Windows Movie Maker
Adobe Premiere Pro
Sony Vegas Pro
Final Cut Pro

References

External links 
Video Editor Homepage
Video Editor Online Help
AVS4YOU Forum
AVS4YOU on Facebook
AVS4YOU YouTube Channel

Video editing software
2003 software